Curtis Thompson may refer to:

 Firebreaker Chip (Curtis Thompson, born 1963), American professional wrestler
 Curtis Thompson (footballer) (born 1993), English footballer for Wycombe Wanderers F.C.
 Curtis Thompson (Shortland Street character)
 Curtis Thompson (javelin thrower) (born 1996), American javelin thrower who competed in the 2018 Athletics World Cup